Twomile Creek is a stream in Vernon County in the U.S. state of Missouri. It is a tributary of the Marmaton River.

See also
List of rivers of Missouri

References

Rivers of Vernon County, Missouri
Rivers of Missouri